John Fallon may refer to:

John Fallon (businessman), CEO of Pearson PLC
John Fallon (footballer) (born 1940), Scottish footballer
John Fallon (golfer) (1913–1985), Scottish golfer
John A. Fallon, former president of Eastern Michigan University
John Fallon Colohan (1862–1932), Ireland's first motorist
John Fallon, discoverer in 1875 of gold in Telluride, Colorado, putting it on the map
John Fallon, 1911 United States amateur boxing champion
John Fallon, priest at Holy Spirit Catholic Regional School
John Fallon, actor who appeared in the 1981 horror film Final Exam
John Fallon (photographer), American surrealist photographer and filmmaker

See also
John Fallon Field, Albany, New York
John Fallon Drive, Cranmore, Sligo, Ireland